Wli Falls Festival is an annual festival celebrated by the chiefs and people of Wli Traditional Area in the Volta Region of Ghana. It comprises Todzi, Agoviefe and Afegame communities. It is usually celebrated in the month of September. Wli Falls is about 20 km from Hohoe.

Celebrations 
During the festival, there is pomp and pageantry. There is also thanksgiving by the chiefs and peoples of the communities.

Significance 
This festival is celebrated to thank God for being kind for providing them with a waterfall that is perennial and provide as a source of water in an arid area.

References 

Festivals in Ghana
Volta Region